Ballon is a surname. Notable people with the name include:

Claude Ballon (1671–1744), French dancer and choreographer
Ellen Ballon (1898–1969), Canadian pianist
Hamelin de Ballon (c. 1060 – 1105/1106), early Norman Baron
Ian C. Ballon, Internet and intellectual property litigator
Josepmir Ballón (born 1988), Peruvian footballer
Pieter Ballon, Belgian historian and communications scholar
Wynebald de Ballon (c. 1058 – c. 1126), early Norman magnate

See also
Balon (surname)
Ballion, surname